The Río Pantaleón is a river in the south of Guatemala. Its sources are located in the Sierra Madre range, on the western slopes of the Volcán de Fuego in the departments of Chimaltenango and Escuintla. The river flows in a south-westerly direction through the coastal lowlands of Escuintla where it joins the San Cristobal River, a tributary of the Coyolate River.

The Pantaleón river's proximity to the active Fuego volcano increases the risks of inundations and mudflows.

References

Rivers of Guatemala